Anam or ANAM may refer to:

Music
 Anam (band), a British modern folk music band
 Anam (album), by the Irish band Clannad
 Australian National Academy of Music

Names
 Anam (name), a given name and surname
 Anam, a possible transliteration of Inaam, a given name of Arabic origin meaning "gift"

Places
 Anam, Cameroon, a village
 Anam (town), a group of eight towns in Anambra State, Nigeria
 Anam, a political unit within Oruk Anam, Akwa Ibom State, Nigeria
 Anam-dong, a neighbourhood (dong) in Seongbuk-gu, Seoul, South Korea
 Anam, more usually Annam (French protectorate), a former territory in central Vietnam

Other uses
 Anam Station, a station on the Seoul Metropolitan Subway
 Anam language, spoken in Papua New Guinea
 Automated Neuropsychological Assessment Metrics, a battery of tests of cognitive functioning
 Gabriel V (Advanced Naval Attack Missile), an Israeli anti-ship missile

See also
 Annam (disambiguation)

